Juan López de Agurto de la Mata (December 22, 1572 – December 24, 1637) was a Catholic prelate who served as Bishop of Coro (later Bishop of Caracas) (1634–1637) and Bishop of Puerto Rico (1630–1634).

Biography
Juan López de Agurto de la Mata was born in San Cristóbal de La Laguna (Tenerife, Spain).
On July 20, 1630, he was appointed by the King of Spain and confirmed on February 10, 1631, by Pope Urban VIII as Bishop of Puerto Rico. On August 8, 1634, he was appointed by the King of Spain and confirmed by Pope Urban VIII as Bishop of Coro. On June 20, 1637, the Diocese of Coro was renamed as the Diocese of Caracas, Santiago de Venezuela. He served as Bishop of Caracas until his death on December 24, 1637.

References

External links and additional sources
 (for Chronology of Bishops) 
 (for Chronology of Bishops) 
 (for Chronology of Bishops) 
 (for Chronology of Bishops) 

1572 births
1637 deaths
Bishops appointed by Pope Urban VIII
People from San Cristóbal de La Laguna
17th-century Roman Catholic bishops in Puerto Rico
17th-century Roman Catholic bishops in Venezuela
Roman Catholic bishops of Puerto Rico
Roman Catholic bishops of Caracas
Roman Catholic bishops of Coro